Orthospila orissusalis is a moth in the family Crambidae. It was described by Francis Walker in 1859. It is found in Indonesia (Sulawesi, the Sula Islands, Sumbawa), India (Sikkim), Sri Lanka, Cambodia, China and Australia.

References

Moths described in 1859
Spilomelinae